Ossian Olavi "Ossi" Blomqvist (12 May 1908 – 3 October 1955) was a Finnish speed skater who won two silver medals at the European all-around championships in 1931 and 1932. He competed over various distances at the 1928, 1932 and 1936 Winter Olympics with the best results of fifth-sixth place in the 5000 m and 10000 m events in 1936. He served as the flag bearer for Finland at the 1932 games. At the world all-around championships Blomqvist placed fifth and seventh in 1931 and 1932, respectively.

References

External links

 Speed skating 1928+1932+1936 

1908 births
1955 deaths
Finnish male speed skaters
Olympic speed skaters of Finland
Speed skaters at the 1928 Winter Olympics
Speed skaters at the 1932 Winter Olympics
Speed skaters at the 1936 Winter Olympics
Sportspeople from Helsinki